Superstocks (previously known as A Grade Stockcars) are a premier class of New Zealand Speedway (dirt track racing). Cars are of bespoke design with integral roll cages built to rules provided by Speedway New Zealand. Contact between cars is allowed and is intended as part of the class.

The car
Cars are purpose built by numerous different builders throughout the country.
 Rees Race Cars
 Murray Gordge
 Graeme Barr Motorsport
 Podjursky Tanks
Among others.

Superstocks usually run engines such as
 Toyota VVTI V8
 Nissan VK56 V8
 Nissan VH41 V8
 Ford V8
 Chevrolet V8 or V6

Cars come in all different shapes and designs, varying from the ever-popular and successful Gordge chassis, through to the 'Tank" popularised by Dave Evans.

Championships
Superstocks compete in individual championships nationwide, including:
 New Zealand Superstock Championship
 World 240 Invitational Superstock Championship
 New Zealand Superstock Grand Prix
 North/South Island Superstock Championship
 Battle of the Stocks

These championships are seen as the major events, and the big ones to win. Numerous other events are run throughout the country, ranging from track championships through to series run over a number of meetings.

Another major meeting, is the annual New Zealand Superstock Teams Championship, run at Palmerston North International Speedway, in the first weekend of February.

 Superstock and other New Zealand Speedway Videos

Speedway in New Zealand
Racing car classes